No. 70 Group (Army Co-Operation Training) RAF was a group of the Royal Air Force existing from November 1940 to July 1945. It was split from No. 22 Group RAF, Fighter Command, on 25 November 1940 to handle the increasing responsibility of training RAF units for army co-operation duties. 

The Airborne Forces Experimental Establishment was initially placed under the command of HQ No. 70 Group circa 1942.

In June 1944 it was made up of 285-290 Squadrons; 291 (Hutton Cranswick, Yorks); 567 (RAF Detling), 577 (Castle Bromwich Aerodrome), 587 (RAF Culmhead), 595 (RAF Aberporth), 598 (RAF Peterhead), 631, 639, 650, 667, 679, and 691 Squadrons; two separate flights, No. 43 Operational Training Unit, which had been formed in October 1942 at RAF Larkhill to train army co-operation air observers for deployment on the Auster; the Pilotless Aircraft Unit, Nos 3505-3508 Servicing Units; four airfield care & maintenance parties, including at RAF Ramsbury and Castle Bromwich; the School of Army Co-operation at RAF Old Sarum, and No. 13 Armament Practice Camp.

It was transferred to the Air Defence of Great Britain on 1 June 1943, which was later retitled back to Fighter Command in October 1944. The group was disbanded, soon after the end of the war in Europe, on 17 July 1945.

References

Citations

Bibliography 
Sturtivant, Ray and Hamlin, John. 2007. RAF Flying Training and Support Units. Air-Britain 

070
Military units and formations established in the 1940s
Military units and formations disestablished in 1945